England competed at the 1998 Commonwealth Games in Kuala Lumpur, Malaysia, between 11 and 21 September 1998. England were represented by the Commonwealth Games Council for England (CGCE). England joined the Commonwealth of Nations as part of the United Kingdom in 1931. In this competition England finished second in the medals table behind Australia.

Sports

Athletics

Badminton

Bowls

Boxing

Cycling

Diving

Gymnastics Artistic

Gymnastics Rhythmic

Hockey

Netball

Shooting

Squash

Swimming

Synchronised swimming

Ten-pin Bowling

Weightlifting

See also
 England at the Commonwealth Games

References

External links
 Official site

1998
1998 in English sport
Nations at the 1998 Commonwealth Games